Low Row is a village in Swaledale, in the Yorkshire Dales, North Yorkshire, England. It lies about 3 miles west of Reeth and is between Healaugh and Gunnerside. It is part of the Richmondshire parish Melbecks. It is a linear village running along one road, the B6270.  To the east, Low Row merges with the settlement of Feetham.

A working farm, Hazel Brow Farm, is open to visitors and 'The Punch Bowl', a stone inn dated 1638, is by the main road.

History
The name Low Row comes from the Norse "The Wra" (a nook). The surname "Raw" is associated with the village. The village was raided by Jacobites in 1745, and bodies probably from that raid are buried at the church in Low Row.

On 5 July 2014, the Tour de France Stage 1 from Leeds to Harrogate passed through the village.

Smarber Chapel and Low Row United Reformed Church
Philip, Lord Wharton, owned land in the area.  On this stood a number of shooting lodges including one at Crackpot, near Keld, and one at Smarber, a small hamlet on the ridge to the west of Low Row.  A Puritan sympathiser, in around 1690 Wharton converted part of the Smarber lodge into a chapel for ‘Protestant Dissenters’.  He particularly had the needs of the local lead miners in mind.

It was a small, simple building; the lower part of the dry-stone wall remains and shows evidence of plaster and the location of a window.  At the east end, an adjoining barn still stands.  This also shows traces of plaster and windows and is considered originally to have been a cottage attached to the chapel.  It is known  that Wharton bought land near Kirkby Stephen, the income from which was to support a minister at Smarber.

In 1809 a new chapel was built, beside the road at the west end of Low Row, and the former building fell into disrepair.  Having originally tended to favour the Presbyterian position, the chapel declared itself Congregational in 1867, during the 50-year ministry of John Boyd.  He also supervised a major rebuild in 1874.  This cost over £300 and resulted in the building as seen today.  Now part of the United Reformed Church, an active congregation continues to worship in the chapel and ‘pilgrimages’ to the former building take place from time to time.

References

External links

Low Row United Reformed Church, including a history

Villages in North Yorkshire
Swaledale